Cristești is a commune in Botoșani County, Western Moldavia, Romania. It is composed of four villages: Cristești, Oneaga, Schit-Orășeni, and Unguroaia.

Natives
 Dorin Alupei
 Joseph Ishill

References

Communes in Botoșani County
Localities in Western Moldavia